KBTC (1250 AM) is a radio station licensed to serve Houston, Missouri, United States.  The station, established in 1962, is currently owned by Justin Dixon, through licensee Media Professional, LLC.

KBTC broadcasts a sports format provided by ESPN Radio.

References

External links

BTC
Sports radio stations in the United States
Radio stations established in 1962
1962 establishments in Missouri
ESPN Radio stations